Nayband Rural District is in Chah-e Mobarak District of Asaluyeh County, Bushehr province, Iran. At the censuses of 2006 and 2011, its constituent parts were in Asaluyeh District of Kangan County. At the 2006 census, the population was 10,437 in 1,632 households. The following census in 2011 counted 13,220 people in 2,709 households. The rural district's establishment within Chah-e Mobarak District was officially announced on 12 December 2012. At the most recent census of 2016, the population of the rural district was 5,625 in 1,298 households. The largest of its eight villages was Besatin, with 1,244 people.

References 

Rural Districts of Bushehr Province
Populated places in Asaluyeh County